Lac de la Lauch is a lake in Haut-Rhin, France.

Lakes of Haut-Rhin